Cynometra gillmanii is a species of plant in the family Fabaceae. It is found only in Tanzania. It is threatened by habitat loss.

Taxonomy

References

gillmanii
Endemic flora of Tanzania
Taxonomy articles created by Polbot
Endangered flora of Africa